In the theory of fair cake-cutting, the Radon–Nikodym set (RNS) is a geometric object that represents a cake, based on how different people evaluate the different parts of the cake.

Example 
Suppose we have a cake made of four parts. There are two people, Alice and George, with different tastes: each person values the different parts of the cake differently. The table below describes the parts and their values; the last row, "RNS Point", is explained afterwards.

The "RNS point" of a piece of cake describes the relative values of the partners to that piece. It has two coordinates – one for Alice and one for George. For example:
 The partners agree on the values for the chocolate part, so the coordinates of its RNS point are also equal (they are normalized such that their sum is 1). 
 The lemon part is only valuable for Alice, so in its RNS point, only Alice's coordinate is 1 while George's coordinate is 0.
 In both the vanilla and the cherries part, the ratio between Alice's value to George's value is 1:4. Hence, this is also the ratio between the coordinates of their RNS points. Note that both the vanilla and the cherries are mapped to the same RNS point.

The RNS of a cake is just the set of all its RNS points; in the above cake this set contains three points:  {(0.5,0.5), (1,0), (0.2,0.8)}. It can be represented by the segment (1,0)-(0,1):

In effect, the cake is decomposed and re-constructed on the segment (1,0)-(0,1).

Definitions 

There are  partners. Every partner  has a personal value measure .

Define the following measure:

Therefore, by the Radon–Nikodym theorem, it has a Radon–Nikodym derivative, which is a function  such that for every measurable subset :

The  are called value-density functions. They have the following properties, for almost all points of the cake :
 
 

The RNS of a cake is the set of all its RNS points:

The cake is decomposed and then re-constructed inside . Each fraction of the cake is mapped to a point in  according to the valuations: the more valuable a piece is to a partner, the closer it is to that partner's vertex. This is shown in the above example for  partners (where  is just the segment between (1,0) and (0,1)). Akin describes the meaning of the RNS for  partners:
We imagine a table shaped like an equilateral triangle with each consumer seated at a vertex...  the desirability to consumer  of a fragment of cake at a point  is given by the barycentric coordinate  measuring its closeness to vertex . Thus,  is 1 at the vertex and declines linearly to value 0 at the opposite face.

Efficient RNS partitions  
The unit simplex  can be partitioned among the partners, giving each partner  a subset . Each such partition induces a partition of the cake , in which partner  receives the bits of  whose RNS-points fall within .

Here are two example partitions for the two-partner example, where  is the segment between (1,0) and (0,1)
 Cut  in the point (0.4,0.6). Give the segment (1,0)-(0.4,0.6) to Alice and the segment (0.4,0.6)-(0,1) to George. This corresponds to giving the Lemon and Chocolate to Alice (total value 27) and the rest to George (total value 12). 
 Cut in the same point (0.4,0.6), but give the segment (1,0)-(0.4,0.6) to George (total value 18) and the segment (0.4,0.6)-(0,1) to Alice (total value 3).
The first partition looks much more efficient than the second one: in the first partition, each partner is given the pieces that are more valuable to him/her (closer to his/her vertex of the simplex), while in the second partition the opposite is true. In fact, the first partition is Pareto efficient while the second partition is not. For example, in the second partition, Alice can give the cherries to George in exchange for 2/9 of the chocolate; this will improve Alice's utility by 2 and George's utility by 4. This example illustrates a general fact that we define below.

For every point :
For all  and for all : 
I.e:
For all  and for all : 

It is possible to prove that:
A partition  belongs to a positive point ,
if-and-only-if it maximizes the sum: 
I.e, iff it is a weighted-utilitarian-maximal division with weight vector .

Since every Pareto-efficient division is weighetd-utilitarian-maximal for some selection of weights, the following theorem is also true:
if-and-only-if it is Pareto-efficient.

Returning to the above example:
Indeed, it is a utilitarian cake-cutting that maximizes the sum , and it is also Pareto-efficient.
 In contrast, the second partition does not belong to any point, and indeed it is not Pareto-efficient.
 There are some points to which many different partitions belong. For example, the point . All these partitions maximize the sum ; indeed, this sum is 78 in all these partitions. They are all Pareto-efficient.

History 
The RNS was introduced as part of the Dubins–Spanier theorems and used in the proof of Weller's theorem and later results by Ethan Akin. The term "Radon–Nikodym set" was coined by Julius Barbanel.

See also 
 Individual pieces set

References 

Cake-cutting
Measure theory